Marina Tozzini is an Italian Paralympic swimmer. She represented Italy at the 1996 Summer Paralympics held in Atlanta, United States and she won the silver medal in the women's 400 metres freestyle S9 event. She also won the bronze medal in the women's 100 metres butterfly S9 event.

References

External links 
 

Living people
Year of birth missing (living people)
Place of birth missing (living people)
Italian female freestyle swimmers
Swimmers at the 1996 Summer Paralympics
Medalists at the 1996 Summer Paralympics
Paralympic silver medalists for Italy
Paralympic bronze medalists for Italy
Paralympic medalists in swimming
Paralympic swimmers of Italy
Italian female butterfly swimmers
S9-classified Paralympic swimmers